Kelley may refer to:

 Kelley (name), a given name and surname

Places
United States
 Kelley, Iowa
 Kelley Hill in Fort Benning, Georgia
 Kelley Park, in San Jose, California
 Kelley Square, in Worcester, Massachusetts
 Kelley Township, Ripley County, Missouri
 Kelleys Island, Ohio
 Kelleytown, Georgia
Antarctica
 Kelley Massif
 Kelley Nunatak
 Kelley Peak (Antarctica)
 Kelley Spur
Other
 Kelley Barracks, in  Stuttgart-Möhringen, Germany
 Kelley's Cove, Nova Scotia, in Canada

Schools
 Bishop Kelley Catholic School, in Lapeer, Michigan
 Bishop Kelley High School, in Tulsa, Oklahoma
 Kelley School of Business, of Indiana University

Structures
 Harry W. Kelley Memorial Bridge, in Maryland
 Kelley and Browne Flats, in St. Joseph, Missouri
 Kelley House (disambiguation), various locations

Other uses
 Kelley Blue Book, for used automobile prices
 Kelley Branch, a watercourse in Missouri
 Kelley Stand Road, in Vermont
 Kelley-Roosevelts Asiatic Expedition, of 1928–1929
 USNS Sgt. Jonah E. Kelley (T-APC-116), a former auxiliary support vessel of the U.S. Navy

See also
 Kelly (disambiguation)
 Kellie (disambiguation)
 Kelli (disambiguation)